Ekşiler (also called Eşkiler)  is a village in Silifke district of Mersin Province, Turkey. It is situated in the Göksu River valley. The village is to the north of Göksu River and Turkish state highway . The population of the village was 118 in 2012. The main economic activities of the village are farming and animal breeding.

References

Villages in Silifke District